A coaster, drink coaster, beverage coaster, or beermat is an item used to rest drinks upon. Coasters protect the surface of a table or any other surface where the user might place a glass. Coasters on top of a beverage can also be used to show that a drink is not finished or to prevent contamination (usually from insects). Coasters can also stop hot drinks from burning the table surface.

Pubs usually have beermats spread out across their surfaces. They are used to protect the table's surface, typically made of paper, and can also absorb condensation dripping along the glass or serve as an ad-hoc notebook. Beermats are often branded with trademarks or alcohol advertising. Beermats are not to be confused with bar mats, rectangular pieces of rubber, or absorbent material used to protect the countertops or floors, and limit the spread of spilled drinks in a bar or pub.

History

The first coasters were designed for decanters or wine bottles so that they could be slid (or "coasted") around the dinner table after the servants had retired. They were in common use after about 1760. Early coasters took the form of a shallow tray or dish made of wood, papier-mâché, silver, or silver plate.

In 1880, a German printing company, Friedrich Horn, introduced the first beermats made of cardboard. In 1892, Robert Sputh of Dresden manufactured the first beermat made of wood pulp. Watney brewery introduced them to the United Kingdom in 1920 to advertise their pale ale. The packaging company Quarmby Promotions, established in 1872, began manufacturing beermats in Milnsbridge in 1931. After Quarmby Promotions was taken over by the Katz Group, it moved production to Brighouse and in 2006 to Morley, West Yorkshire, before closing its production in 2009.

Saucers are also long used in western culture for much the same purpose. When drinking tea, it is customary to use a cup and saucer set. By the mid-twentieth century, drink coasters made in many materials and styles were manufactured for domestic use. Today, they are common as everyday houseware pieces and are also used in restaurants.

Manufacture

Coasters are often made from high grammage paperboard but may also be made from several layers of tissue paper. Drink coasters are also sometimes made from soapstone, metal, wood, and silicone. Important parameters for beer mats are water absorbency, wet rub, and printability.

In recent times, glass coasters with empty frames have been produced, consumers can then personalize their coasters with their unique pictures or designs. As for beermat manufacturers, they have overhauled their manufacturing processes, allowing for cheaper small-scale orders, which has expanded the reach of the beermat with individuals choosing to have bespoke beermats printed for their wedding and political parties utilizing them to deliver campaign messages. 

Some drink coasters can be recycled.

Coaster imprints
Beermats are usually adorned with a customized image, usually mentioning or advertising a brand of beer. However, they can also promote a drinking establishment, sports franchise, businesses, or special events.

Tegestology
Some coasters are collectible items. Tegestology is a term coined from Latin ( "covering" or "mat", and ) defined as the practice of collecting beermats or coasters, with practitioners known as tegestologists. A 1960 British Pathé News short shows comedy duo Morecambe and Wise as tegestologists.

References

Bartending equipment
Beer advertising
Beer vessels and serving
Collecting
Domestic implements
Drinkware
Ephemera
Paper products
Serving and dining